Lester Louis Adler (born December 13, 1933) is an American record and film producer and the co-owner of the Roxy Theatre in West Hollywood, California. Adler has produced and developed a number of iconic musical artists, including The Grass Roots, Jan & Dean, The Mamas & the Papas and Carole King. King's album Tapestry, produced by Adler, won the 1972 Grammy Award for Album of the Year and has been called one of the greatest pop albums of all time.

Adler was an executive producer of The Rocky Horror Picture Show and discovered and produced comedy albums and films for Cheech & Chong. In 2006, Adler was awarded a star on the Hollywood Walk of Fame for his achievements in music. He was inducted into the Rock & Roll Hall of Fame in 2013 as the winner, alongside Quincy Jones, of the Ahmet Ertegun Award.

Career

Music
His career in music began as co-manager, alongside Herb Alpert, of Jan & Dean. Adler and Alpert transitioned from managing into songwriting, composing the songs "River Rock" in 1958 for Bob "Froggy" Landers and The Cough Drops and "Wonderful World" with Sam Cooke.

In 1964, Adler founded Dunhill Records. He was president and chief record producer of the label from 1964 to 1967. During that time, Adler signed The Mamas & the Papas to Dunhill, producing six top-five hits for the group, including "California Dreamin'" and "Monday, Monday". Dunhill also reached #1 on the pop charts with Barry McGuire's single "Eve of Destruction". Through additional efforts by co-producers and songwriting duo P.F. Sloan and Steve Barri, the label reached #8 on the pop charts with The Grass Roots single "Let's Live for Today".

Capitalizing on Dunhill's success, Adler sold the label to ABC in 1967 and founded Ode Records, to which he signed Carole King, Spirit, Cheech & Chong, Scott McKenzie, Peggy Lipton, and others. Adler produced all of King's albums on Ode, which include four gold, one platinum, and one diamond album, as certified by the RIAA. King's second album for Ode, Tapestry, sold more than 25 million copies worldwide, and is considered one of the greatest albums of all time. Adler's work on Tapestry garnered him two Grammy Awards in 1972: Record of the Year (for producing "It's Too Late") and Album of the Year.

In addition to work with his own label's artists, Adler produced a number of live albums for Johnny Rivers. In June 1967, Adler helped to produce the Monterey International Pop Festival, as well as the film version, Monterey Pop, which he co-produced with John Phillips from The Mamas & the Papas.

Film

After Monterey Pop, Adler and Phillips teamed up again to produce the 1970 Robert Altman film, Brewster McCloud. In 1975, Adler served as executive producer of the cult classic The Rocky Horror Picture Show. After seeing The Rocky Horror Show at a theater in London, Adler bought the American rights to the show, presented it live in Los Angeles, and executive-produced the film version (adding "Picture" to the title). The movie went on to become the longest-running theatrical film in history.

In 1978, Adler directed the movie Up in Smoke, starring Cheech & Chong. The movie remains a cult hit, and in 2000 Adler recorded a commentary track along with Cheech Marin for the DVD release. His 1981 film, Ladies and Gentlemen, The Fabulous Stains, did not make a large impact upon release but has enjoyed a long life on cable TV broadcasts. Also in 1981, Adler executive produced the follow-up to The Rocky Horror Picture Show, Shock Treatment.

Personal life
Adler was born to a Jewish family, the son of Manny and Josephine (Alpert) Adler in Chicago, Illinois in 1933 and raised in the Boyle Heights section of Los Angeles, California. Adler was married to actress and singer Shelley Fabares in 1964 and produced several of her songs. They separated in 1966 but were not formally divorced until 1980. In 1973 he fathered his first son, Nic Adler, with actress Britt Ekland. In 1978 he fathered another son, Cisco Adler, with then-girlfriend Phyllis Somer. In the 1980s his son Sonny was born from a brief relationship. Today, Adler is married to former actress Page Hannah, three decades his junior. The couple has four sons: Manny, Ike, Pablo, and Oscar.

Adler could often be seen sitting courtside next to Jack Nicholson at Los Angeles Lakers home games, as reported in 2020. Adler owns The Roxy Theatre with his son Nic, who operates the historic music venue on the Sunset Strip in West Hollywood, California. Peter Fonda based his character Terry Valentine in The Limey on Adler.

In 1976, Adler and his administrative assistant were kidnapped from their Malibu home. One of the perpetrators pulled a gun on Adler's administrative assistant, and gained entry. The two men were held for eight hours and released after $25,000 in ransom money was paid.  Three suspects were arrested and sheriff's deputies later recovered $14,900 of the ransom money. Two suspects were later convicted and one suspect was later sentenced to life in prison.

Production discography

The following is a list of albums produced by Lou Adler:

Filmography
The following is a list of films produced and/or directed by Lou Adler:

Monterey Pop (1968) – producer
Brewster McCloud (1970) – producer
The Rocky Horror Picture Show (1975) – executive producer
Up in Smoke (1978) – director, producer
Shock Treatment (1981) – executive producer
Ladies and Gentlemen, The Fabulous Stains (1982) – director
Murphy's Romance (1985) – music producer
American Me (1992) – executive producer
Cheech & Chong's Animated Movie (2013) – producer
 The Rocky Horror Picture Show: Let's Do the Time Warp Again (2016) – producer

References

External links
 
Allmusic Bio
 
 The Pop Chronicles interviewed Adler on 1.1.1968; he appears in shows [ 2], [ 21], [ 35, 36], and [ 47.]
 The Grass Roots Official Site

1933 births
Living people
Film producers from California
Record producers from California
Grammy Award winners
American music industry executives
Businesspeople from Los Angeles
People from Boyle Heights, Los Angeles
Jewish American songwriters
Fairfax High School (Los Angeles) alumni
Film directors from Los Angeles
21st-century American Jews